Carlos Betancourt (born 4 June 1959) is a Puerto Rican boxer. He competed in the men's middleweight event at the 1976 Summer Olympics. He lost in his opening fight to Dragomir Vujkovic of Yugoslavia.

References

External links
 

1959 births
Living people
Puerto Rican male boxers
Olympic boxers of Puerto Rico
Boxers at the 1976 Summer Olympics
Place of birth missing (living people)
Middleweight boxers